Master Blaster may refer to:

Film and Television 
 Masterblaster (film), a 1987 American movie
 Master Blaster, a pair of characters from the 1985 action adventure Mad Max Beyond Thunderdome
 "Master Blaster", the TV series Beast Wars episode (1999)
 Master Blaster, a character from the series Kidd Video
 Master Blasters, an American game show that debuted on July 27, 2005

Music 
 Master Blaster (band), a German dance band
 "Master Blaster (Jammin')", a 1980 song by Stevie Wonder
 "Masterblaster 2000", a hit cover of "Master Blaster (Jammin')" by DJ Luck & MC Neat
 "Master Blaster", a 1996 song by Nikka Costa from Butterfly Rocket

People 
 Master Blaster (musician), former Ugandan dance-hall musician
 Sachin Tendulkar, Indian former cricketer
 Viv Richards, West Indian Cricketer
 Sanath Jayasuriya, Srilankan cricketer
 Joe Weider, Canadian bodybuilder and businessman

Water park rides 
 Master Blaster or MasterBlaster, a type of water coaster
 Master Blaster (Schlitterbahn), a water coaster at Schlitterbahn, New Braunfels, Texas, U.S.
 Master Blaster, a roller coaster at Sandcastle Waterworld, England

Other uses 
 Master Blaster, the job title of a senior explosives engineer working with materials such as Tovex
 The Master Blasters, a professional wrestling tag team

See also 
 Blaster Master (disambiguation)
 Raster Blaster